Salacak is a neighborhood in the Üsküdar municipality of Istanbul, Turkey. It is located on the Asian shore of the Bosporus, to the south of the historic center of Üsküdar.

The word salacak means "bench for washing a corpse," but the name is reported to come from sala meaning "village" (language unspecified) with the Turkish suffix -cık, "small."

The neighborhood's best-known landmark is the Maiden's Tower (Kız Kulesi), just offshore from Salacak in the Bosporus.

Notes

References
 Printed sources

External links
 Miscellaneous images of Salacak

Neighbourhoods of Üsküdar
Fishing communities in Turkey